"Ain't it Funky Now" is a funk instrumental by James Brown. Released as a two-part single in 1969, the song charted #3 R&B and #24 Pop. The recording also appeared on the 1970 album Ain't It Funky.

A live performance of "Ain't It Funky Now" is included on Love Power Peace (1992; recorded 1971).

Chart performance

References

1969 songs
1969 singles
James Brown songs
Songs written by James Brown
1960s instrumentals
King Records (United States) singles
1969 neologisms
Quotations from music